Khieu Rada (born April 15, 1949 in Battambang) is a Cambodian politician. He is the son of Khieu In and Sing Tep.

Education 
 C final exam (1969), M.G.P. (Physical General mathematics - 1970)
 S.P.C.N. (Sciences, Physical, Natural Chemistry), Master es Sciences (1973)
 C.N.A.M. (General mathematics - 1982) in France
 AFPA of analysis Programming and Teleprocessing (1982) in France
 Engineer Conceptor (Cap Gemini)

Politics 
 President of the UPAKAF (Union of Patriots of the Kampuchea in France) in 1979
 Founding member of the Confederation of the Khmers Nationalists with Norodom Sihanouk in 1979
 Founding member of the FUNCINPEC in 1981 with Norodom Sihanouk
 President Director of the FUNCINPEC Television (Channel 9) in 1992
 Vice Minister of Relations with the Parliament of the G.N.P. in 1993
 Advisor of the Prime Minister the Prince Norodom Ranariddh from 1993 to 1994
 Honorary member of the Royal Cabinet with rank of Minister since the 28 January 1994
 Under Secretary of State of the Trade Ministry of Cambodia from 1994 to 1995
 Delegation Chief of Cambodia at United Nation Conference about Trade and Development
 Secretary General of the Khmer National Party (renamed to Sam Rainsy Party) Cambodia from 1995 to 1997
 President of the Khmer Unity Party (KUP) from 23 October 1997 to June 2006
 Vice Deleguate General of the Sangkum Jatiniyum Front Party of Prince Sisowath Thomico from July 2006 to September 2007
 President Adviser of Sam Rainsy Party from October 2007 to January 2008
 President Adviser of FUNCINPEC, Vice-President of Kampong Cham Province and President of Stung Trâng (Kampong Cham Province) since February 2008

References

1949 births
Living people
FUNCINPEC politicians
Candlelight Party politicians
Alliance of the National Community politicians